Site-specific may refer to:

 Site-specific art
 Site-specific recombination, in molecular biology  
 Site-specific theatre